Martha Komu (born March 23, 1983, in Gathanji, Laikipia District) is a Kenyan runner who specialises in a marathon. She won the Paris Marathon in 2008 and finished fifth at the 2008 Summer Olympics.

Career 
Komu started her education at Nyakiambi and Lariak primary schools. In 1997 she went to Laikipia High School, where she started running. In her early career she took part in various road running and cross country running competitions, but without major success. In 2003, she moved her base to France, where she represents the Clermont Athlétisme Auvergne athletics club.

After a maternity break in 2005, she returned to competition in 2006 and won the Mont Saint-Michel marathon, her debut marathon. She also won the Rheims marathon in 2006 and 2007. In 2008, she won the Paris Marathon, setting a personal record of 2:25.33 hours. This performance earned her a place in the Kenyan Olympics team. Her husband Simon Munyutu finished 11th in the men's race at the 2008 Paris Marathon; their combined time of 4:34:57 hours, according to marathon statistician Marty Post, is the best achieved by a married couple in the same marathon.

Personal life 
Komu was the sixth born of twelve children. Her father used to be a runner and her elder brother Francis Komu is a road running competitor.

She is married to Simon Munyutu, a Kenyan-born runner who represents France. They both competed at the 2008 Olympics, but for different countries. They have a daughter born in 2005.

Achievements

2006 Mont-Saint-Michel Marathon - 1st
2007 Rotterdam Marathon - 8th
2008 Paris Marathon - 1st

References

External links

 
 
 Marta Komu at Marathoninfo.free.fr

1983 births
Living people
Athletes (track and field) at the 2008 Summer Olympics
Kenyan female long-distance runners
Olympic athletes of Kenya
Paris Marathon female winners
21st-century Kenyan women